Agrahāyaṇa or Mārgaśīrṣa, is the ninth month of the Hindu calendar. In India's national civil calendar, Agrahāyaṇa is also the ninth month of the year, beginning on 21 November and ending on 
20 December. Mārgaśīrṣa means related to the Mrigashīrsha nakṣatra (asterism), which has been known since Vedic times. In Tamil, Mārgasīrsa is also known as Margaḻi. 

In lunar religious calendars, Agrahāyaṇa/Mārgaśīrṣa may begin on either the new moon or the full moon around the same time of year and is usually the ninth month of the year.

In solar religious calendars, Agrahāyaṇa/Margaḻi begins with the Sun's entry into Scorpio and is the ninth month of the year.

Festivals
Vaikuṇṭha Ekādaśī, the Ekādaśī (i.e. 11th lunar day) of Mārgaśīrṣa month, is celebrated also as Mokṣadā Ekādaśī. The 10th Canto, 22nd Chapter of Bhāgavata Purāṇa mentions the young marriageable daughters (gopis) of the cowherd men of Gokula worshiping Lady Kātyāyanī and taking a vrata, or vow, during the entire month of Mārgaśīrṣa, the first month of the winter season (Śiśira), to get Lord Krishna as their husband.

Bhairava Ashtami falls on Krishna paksha Ashtami of this month of Mārgaśīrṣa.  On this day, it is said that Lord Shiva appeared on earth in the fierce manifestation (avatāra) as Śrī Kalabhairava. This day is commemorated with special prayers and rituals.

In Odisha, all Thursdays in this month are celebrated as Manabasa Gurubara, wherein Lady Lakshmi is worshipped by Hindu women.

In Tamil Nadu, during this month of "Margaḻi", women make "kolams" or "rangoli" early in the morning. Devotees usually go to temples early in the morning and recite Thiruppavai by Andal and Thiruvempavai by Manikkavacakar.

See also

 Astronomical basis of the Hindu calendar
Hindu units of measurement
 Hindu astronomy
 Jyotiṣa
 Precession of the earth, Equinox

References

09